Tikapur is a Municipality in Kailali District in Sudurpashchim Province of Nepal that was established in January 1997. Tikapur Municipality was further expanded on 10 March 2017 through merger with the two former Village development committees Narayanpur and Dansinhapur. It lies on the bank of Karnali River.

At the time of the 2011 Nepal census it had a population of 98,651 people living in 15,356 individual households. Tikapur is 3rd largest city in Sudurpashchim pradesh after Dhangadhi and Bhimdutta (formerly Mahendranagar).

Transportation  
Tikapur Airport is an out-of-service airport that lies in Tikapur.

Mayoral Election
{| class="wikitable"
|-
! Party !! Candidate !! Votes !! Status
|-
|[People's Freedom Part (नागरीक उन्मुक्ती पार्टी)] || Ram Lal Dagaura Tharu (रामलाल डगौरा थारु) || 9642  || Elected   

Deputy Mayor Election

References

External links
 UN map of the municipalities of Kailali District

Populated places in Kailali District
Nepal municipalities established in 1997
Municipalities in Kailali District